Motorway 24 is a motorway in Greece. It connects Motorway 2, which passes through the northern outskirts of Thessaloniki with Nea Moudania on the Chalkidiki peninsula in the south, via the city of Thessaloniki. Between Efkarpia and the Kalamaria interchange, the A24 forms part of the eastern beltway of Thessaloniki, the Thessaloniki Inner Ring Road.

Exit list

The exits of the A24 motorway:

Gallery

References

24
Roads in Central Macedonia